The Viet Cuong Hotel in  Qui Nhơn was bombed by the Viet Cong on the evening of 10 February 1965, during the Vietnam War. Viet Cong (VC) operatives detonated explosive charges causing the entire building to collapse. The operation killed 23 U.S. servicemen, seven Vietnamese civilians, and two of the Viet Cong attackers.

Background
The 4-storey Khách Sạn Viet Cuong or Viet Cuong Hotel ("Strength of Vietnam") was used as a U.S. Army enlisted men's billet in the city of Qui Nhơn. Many of the 60 men billeted there came from the 140th Transportation Detachment (Cargo Helicopter Field Maintenance) who provided maintenance support for the 117th Assault Helicopter Company based at Qui Nhơn Airfield.

Following the VC Attack on Camp Holloway on 6–7 February 1965, the U.S. and South Vietnamese launched Operation Flaming Dart, a series of retaliatory airstrikes against North Vietnam. In retaliation for the Flaming Dart attacks the VC immediately planned to hit another U.S. target.

Explosion
At 20:05 the VC began their assault on the hotel, while 2 VC were killed by machine-gun fire by a U.S. sentry on the hotel roof; VC killed the South Vietnamese guards posted outside the building and placed satchel charges at the main door. A 100-pound plastic charge was detonated next to the staircase which provided the main structural support for the building. The explosion caused the entire hotel to pancake to the ground. 21 members of the 140th Transportation Detachment were killed as were 2 other soldiers and 7 Vietnamese civilians.

Aftermath
Following this attack President Johnson ordered Operation Flaming Dart II. All U.S. dependents in South Vietnam were returned to the U.S.

References

Qui Nhơn Hotel bombing
Qui Nhơn Hotel bombing
Explosions in 1965
1965 in military history
United States Army in the Vietnam War
Viet Cuong
Viet Cuong
February 1965 events in Asia
Attacks in Vietnam